Camalaniugan National High school is located in Camalaniugan, Cagayan, Philippines. It was established in 1947 and offers grades 7 to 12 levels.

Schools in Cagayan